The Mike Flowers Pops (also known as MFP, The Pops or The Mike Flowers Pops Orchestra) are a British easy listening band fronted by Mike Flowers (real name Michael Roberts). Mike Roberts was born in Liverpool in 1960, now married with 2 children & living in London, studied Painting at Chelsea School of Art (1978-81) and did an MA in Music at Goldsmiths (2012-14). In the mid-1990s he enjoyed an unlikely pop profile as easy listening bandleader Mike Flowers of The Mike Flowers Pops, including a UK No. 2 chart hit with his version of the Oasis song ‘Wonderwall’ (according to Lou Reed, one of the funniest things he’d ever heard). He has since scored music for film and television, and made music documentaries for Sky Arts and London’s Barbican Centre. How Art Made Pop is his first book and supported by the "Sounds Superb Singers" and "Super Stereo Brass". Formed in 1993, there can be up to fourteen of them on stage at any time, and they are principally known for easy listening or lounge music covers of both 'classic' and contemporary pop music.

The title "MFP" parodies the budget record label Music for Pleasure, also known as MFP, which produced a series of "Hot Hits" cover version albums in the 1960s and 1970s.

History 

The band became famous in the UK in 1995 when they released a cover version of Oasis' hit song "Wonderwall". After seeing the band perform, BBC radio producer Will Saunders recruited Flowers for BBC Radio 1 DJ Kevin Greening in order to cover the 'Hits of 95' for Greening's Saturday show; "Wonderwall" was his first week's project. Chris Evans heard the song and made it 'single of the week' on his Radio 1 breakfast show, telling listeners that this was the original version of the song. The single, issued by London Records under the name The Mike Flowers Pops, was released while the Oasis original was still in the UK Singles Chart, and itself reached the Top 10. Flowers' version peaked at number 2 in the UK Christmas 1995 chart and got to number one in Scotland.
Lou Reed, when asked at the time whether he had heard anything by Oasis, claimed: "Not that I would know. Oh, Wonderwall? The one I know is the Mike Flowers one. That is one of the funniest things I've ever heard in my life."
    
Following the success of "Wonderwall", The Mike Flowers Pops quickly advanced from performing shows in nightclubs and small concert halls to touring festivals and larger venues across Britain and Europe. A Groovy Place was released on 24 June 1996. At the end of 1996 they toured Britain with Gary Glitter on his last 'Who's in the Gang' tour. They played large venues including Wembley Arena and Birmingham NEC. Cover versions of The Doors' "Light My Fire", and "Don't Cry for Me Argentina" also reached the top 40 of the UK chart.

The Mike Flowers Pops played at the Shiiine On Weekender in November 2016 and at the 100 Club in London in December 2016 and December 2017.

Discography

Albums
Studio
A Groovy Place (1996)

Compilations
Get Easy! The Future Collection Volume 2 (included "MacArthur Park" by The Mike Flowers Pops) (1995)
The Freebase Connection: The Mike Flowers Pops meets Aphex Twin (1996)
The Cocktail Shaker-New Groove Kitsch and Space-Age Pop (1997)
Austin Powers: International Man of Mystery soundtrack (1997)
Mike Flowers meets Cylob (1999)
Constant Friction - Collaboration 2 (1999)
The Karminsky Experience Inc - The Power of Suggestion (2002)

Singles
"Wonderwall" (1995), UK #2
"Light My Fire" / "Please Release Me" (1996), UK #39
"Don't Cry for Me Argentina" (1996), UK #30
"Talk" (2005, digital single)
Hold the Corner EP (2016, collaboration with Cornershop)

References

External links
 

English pop music groups
British parodists
Parody musicians
Musical groups established in 1992